The Nebraska–Kearney Lopers are the athletic teams that represent the University of Nebraska at Kearney, located in Kearney, Nebraska, in intercollegiate sports as a member of the Division II level of the National Collegiate Athletic Association (NCAA), primarily competing in the Mid-America Intercollegiate Athletics Association (MIAA) for most of its sports since the 2012–13 academic year; while its women's swimming and diving team competes in the Northern Sun Intercollegiate Conference (NSIC). The Lopers previously competed in the D-II Rocky Mountain Athletic Conference (RMAC) from 1994–95 to 2011–12 (which they were a member on a previous stint as a provisional member during the 1989–90 school year); and in the Central States Intercollegiate Conference (CSIC) of the National Association of Intercollegiate Athletics (NAIA) from 1976–77 to 1988–89.

Conference affiliations 
 1916–17 to 1927–28: Nebraska Collegiate Conference
 1928–29 to 1942–43: Nebraska Intercollegiate Athletic Association
 1943–44 to 1975–76: Nebraska Collegiate Conference
 1976–77 to 1988–89: Central States Intercollegiate Conference
 1989–90 to 1993–94: Independent
 1994–95 to 2011–12: Rocky Mountain Athletic Conference
 2012–13 to present: Mid-America Intercollegiate Athletics Association

Varsity teams 
UNK competes in 17 intercollegiate varsity sports: Men's sports include basketball, cross country, football, tennis, track & field (indoor and outdoor) and wrestling; basketball, cross country, golf, soccer, softball, swimming & diving, tennis, track & field (indoor and outdoor) and volleyball.

Softball
The Lopers softball team appeared in the first three Women's College World Series in 1969, 1970 and 1971.

Women's swim and dive
The Women's swim and dive team is an affiliate member of the Rocky Mountain Athletic Conference (RMAC).

Mascot
The mascot at University of Nebraska at Kearney is Louie, who has been at the college since the beginning. He is always at every UNK Athletic event cheering on the Lopers with the cheerleaders.

Facilities
 Foster Field at Ron & Carol Cope Stadium – Home of the Loper football and soccer teams
 Cushing Pool – Home of the Loper Swim & Dive team
 Dryden Park – Home of the UNK Softball team
 Harmon Park – Home of the UNK Tennis team
 Health and Sports Center – Home of the UNK Basketball, Wrestling, and Volleyball teams
 Kearney Memorial Field – Home of the UNK Baseball team (Once home to a New York Yankees minor league team, Nebraska State League)

Notable alumni
 Kamaru Usman, former UFC Welterweight Champion and 2010 NCAA Division II Wrestling champion
 Stephen Goodin, NFL player
 Randy Rasmussen, former New York Jets player
 Joba Chamberlain, New York Yankees pitcher
 Tervel Dlagnev, Olympic Wrestler
 Mason Brodine, tight end for the St. Louis Rams
 Arthur Hobbs, defensive back for the Hamilton Tiger-Cats
 George Murdoch, Professional Wrestler, currently signed to the Nation Wrestling Alliance under the ring name Tyrus

References

External links